Aegoceropsis fervida is a species of moth from the genus Aegoceropsis. It is endemic to the central and southern regions of Africa, ranging from Ghana to Zimbabwe.

References 

Agaristinae
Owlet moths of Africa
Lepidoptera of Cameroon
Lepidoptera of Angola
Lepidoptera of Burundi
Lepidoptera of the Republic of the Congo
Lepidoptera of Malawi
Moths described in 1854